The 1973 Scheldeprijs was the 60th edition of the Scheldeprijs cycle race and was held on 31 July 1973. The race was won by Freddy Maertens.

General classification

References

1973
1973 in road cycling
1973 in Belgian sport